Courtney Smith (born December 5, 1974), known professionally by his stage name C-Note, is an American rapper from Houston, Texas. He is a member of the Botany Boyz, part of the Screwed Up Click scene first started by DJ Screw.

His first solo album, Third Coast Born, was an underground success, eventually reaching #67 on Billboards Top R&B/Hip Hop Albums chart. The album was revamped and re-released in 2000, and this also peaked at #91 on the same chart. C-Note has released several albums since then, and made numerous guest appearances (including with Fat Pat, Lil' Flip and Z-Ro). His fourth full-length, Network'n, was released in 2006, and his fifth, Birds Vs Words, in 2016.

Discography

Studio albums
Third Coast Born (1999)
Third Coast Born 2000 (2000)
Street Fame (2003)
Network'n (2006)
Birds Vs Words (2016)

Collaboration albums
Thought of Many Ways with Botany Boyz (1997)
Forever Botany with Botany Boyz (2000)

Mixtapes
Tales From Da Clover (2005)
100% Beef (2005)

References

External links
C-Note at Discogs

African-American male rappers
American male rappers
Living people
Rappers from Houston
Screwed Up Click members
Underground rappers
Gangsta rappers
1976 births
21st-century American rappers
21st-century American male musicians
21st-century African-American musicians
20th-century African-American people